Fenchuganj is an upazila of Sylhet District in the Division of Sylhet, Bangladesh.

Etymology
There are many theories behind the naming of the upazila. Some say that Fenchuganj is named after Penchu (or Fenchui) Shah, a guardian of Shah Malum's dargah, who had a habit of sitting at the ghat of the Kushiyara River during the evening every day. One day, he decided to open up a shop in the ghat, which eventually expanded into Fenchuganj or Fenchu's neighbourhood.

History

After the Conquest of Gour in 1303, some disciples of Shah Jalal migrated and settled in present-day Fenchuganj where they preached Islam to the local people. Shah Malum and Shah Mohabbat migrated to Mahurapur/Mourapur.

In 1907, the Fenchuganj thana was established. Before 1907, it was a part of the Balaganj Thana. During the 1950 East Pakistan riots, the factory of a steamer company was looted and set on fire. Pulin De was murdered near Ilashpur village. under Fenchuganj police station, the houses of Ambika Kabiraj and Makhan Sen were looted and set on fire.

During the Bangladesh Liberation War, The Pakistani army shot two gardeners at the gate of the Fenchuganj Fertiliser Factory in May 1971. The army then proceeded to the Manipuri Tea Garden, killing another two tea labourers.  Dala Bridge (Ilash Pur)and,Kaiyer Warehouse is recognised as a mass killing site during the war and the Ghilachhora Monument stands out to commemorate the tragedies of the war. In 1980, Fenchuganj Thana was upgraded to an upazila.

Geography
It has 13368 households and total area 114.48 km2.

Demographics
As of the 2011 Bangladesh census, Fenchuganj has a population of 138,881 . Males constitute 51.07% of the population, and females 48.93%. This Upazila's eighteen up population is 65383. Fenchuganj has an average literacy rate of 68.5% (7+ years), and the national average of 62.4% literate. Now 91,400 Male are 45,040, and Females are 46,369. Religions: Muslim 88.72%, Hindu 11.25%, Buddhist and Christian 0.03%.

Economy
Fenchuganj Upazila has seven power plants, two urea fertilizer factories, three tea gardens, three rubber gardens, one gas field, Hakaluki Haor (largest Haour in South Asia) and many more.

Farms and industries

Fertiliser Factories are
 Natural Gas Fertiliser Factory Ltd.
(First fertilizer factory planted in Asia)
(Producer : Ammonia, Ammonium sulphate, Urea.)
 Shahjalal Fertiliser Factory Ltd
(The biggest fertiliser factory planted in Bangladesh )

 Power Plants are
Fenchuganj Combined Cycle Gas (170 MW)
Barakatullah Electro Dynamics Limited (51 MW)
Energy prima Ltd ( 50 MW)
Liberty Power US (60 MW)
Kushiara Power Plant Fenchuganj (50 MW)
 Build Own Opora (BOO) 170 MW
 Tea gardens are
Monipur Tea Garden
Muminchara Tea Garden
 Gas field
Fenchuganj Gas Field

Administration
Fenchuganj Upazila is divided into five union parishads: (1 No Fenchuganj), (2 No Maijgaon), (3 No Ghilachora), (4 No Uttar Kushiara), and (5 No Uttar Fenchuganj). The Five union parishads are subdivided into 29 mauzas and 89 villages.

Transport

Fenchuganj has good communication with the rest of the country because it has river, road and rail links. During British rule river and rail travel were popular, following that roads became more used, and more currently the A2( Asian Highway) road built through Fenchuganj, connecting Sylhet-Dhaka and other parts of the country. Established there is a market place on the bank of River Kushiara, with Tuesday and Saturday being the main trading days. People from the surrounding 10–15 miles come to the market to trade and shop. Now there are many local markets which sit every day. Among the views from Fenchuganj are both bridges over Kushiara. Hills around degree college, lake near degree college, fertiliser factory from nearby hill (jola tilla), tea estates, Delwar Hussain mosque, sunset from ilashpur (dhala) bridge and boat trip down the river are very enjoyable.

Education

Fenchugonj Upazila is performing 5.6% above the Bangladesh national average in education. The average rate of education is 68% in Fenchuganj. There are many educational institutions some of these are,

Education

 Colleges are
Fenchuganj Degree College
Fenchuganj Business Management College
Mahmud us Samad Farzana Chowdhury Girls School and College
ManikKuna high school and college
 Schools are
 Kasim Ali Model High School
Fariza Khatun Girls High school
Mahmud us Samad Farzana Chowdhury Girls high School
PPM (Puran Bazar Public Model) High School
NGFF (Natural Gas Fertiliser Factory ltd) School
Syed Riyasod Ali high school
Donaram high school
Uttar Kushiara High School
Manikkuna high school
Syed Afruz Firuz Academy
Hero Child pre-cadet Academy
Ghilachora high school
Jomirun Nessa Academy
Khilpara Primary School 

 Madrasas are
Fenchuganj Mohammadia Kamil Madrasha
Hatuvanga Darussunna Dakhil Madrsah
Ishak Ali madrasha
Moshahid Ali Mohila Madrasha
khil para madrasha

Notable people
Mahmud Us Samad Chowdhury, politician
Shah Malum, 14th-century Muslim preacher 
Shahida Rahman, British author

See also
Islampur, Fenchuganj
Hakaluki Haor
Nurpur, Fenchuganj

References